Rob Taylor (21 March 1945 – 28 November 2015
) was an Australian rules footballer who played with Footscray in the Victorian Football League (VFL).

Notes

External links 		
		
		

		
		
2015 deaths		
1945 births		
		
Australian rules footballers from Victoria (Australia)		
Western Bulldogs players